Claude Richard Robert Rowe (17 July 1904 – 29 September 1973) was an Australian rules footballer who played with North Melbourne in the Victorian Football League (VFL).

He was the younger brother of Richmond player Joe Rowe.

Rowe later served in the Australian Army during World War II.

Notes

External links 

1904 births
1973 deaths
Australian rules footballers from Victoria (Australia)
North Melbourne Football Club players
Eaglehawk Football Club players